Miami City Ballet is an American ballet company based in Miami Beach, Florida, led by artistic director Lourdes Lopez. MCB was founded in 1985 by Toby Lerner Ansin, a Miami philanthropist. Ansin and the founding board hired Edward Villella, former New York City Ballet principal dancer to be the founding artistic director.

A bulk of the company's repertoire is made up of the work of George Balanchine, though the company also performs works by Jerome Robbins, Twyla Tharp, Trey McIntyre, Mark Morris, Jimmy Gamonet, who was the company's founding Resident Choreographer and Ballet Master from 1986 to 1999, Christopher Wheeldon, Justin Peck,  and others, in addition to traditional full-length works including "Giselle" and "Don Quixote".

In 2012, Lourdes Lopez was chosen to replace founding artistic director Edward Villella.

Miami City Ballet features an international ensemble of over 50 dancers. The company has an active repertoire of 88 ballets and performs over 75 times annually. Miami City Ballet serves as the resident ballet company in theaters in the Fort Lauderdale, Miami, and West Palm Beach areas. In addition, the company regularly tours both domestically and internationally. Its North American appearances include the Kennedy Center, the 1996 Olympic Arts Festival, Jacob's Pillow Dance Festival, the Los Angeles Music Center, Spoleto Festival USA, Harris Theater (Chicago) and the New York City Center; while theaters and festivals in Europe, Central America, and South America have hosted the company.

Along with the ballet company, Miami City Ballet hosts a ballet school for students aging between 3 and 18. The school is split into three divisions: Children's division (ages 3 to 7), Student division (ages 8 to 13), and Pre-Professional division (ages 14 to 18). Students must audition to be placed in a division. Like the company, the school focuses on the Balanchine method (or Balanchine technique). MCB school students have the opportunity to perform in the yearly Nutcracker performance that the Miami City Ballet company puts together, and there are a number of intensive summer programs that students are eligible to attend.

References

External links
 
 Archival footage of Balanchine's Square Dance performed by Miami City Ballet in 1989 at Jacob's Pillow
 Archival footage of Christopher Wheeldon's Polyphonia performed by Miami City Ballet in 2017 at Jacob's Pillow

Ballet companies in the United States
Dance in Florida
Culture of Miami
1986 establishments in Florida
Tourist attractions in Miami
Performing groups established in 1986